The Manor of Clifton was a historic manor situated near the City of Nottingham, England. The manor house, known as Clifton Hall is situated on the right bank of the River Trent in the village of Clifton, Nottinghamshire,. about  miles south-west of the historic centre of the City of Nottingham, now partly the campus of Nottingham Trent University and partly a large council estate of modern housing.

The Hall is a  Grade I listed building, and is situated within the Clifton Village Conservation Area. Clifton Hall was remodelled in the late 18th century in Georgian style. The manor was held by the de Clifton (later Clifton) family from the late 13th century to the mid-20th century.

In 2008 Clifton Hall rose to national prominence when it was reported in tabloid newspapers that its millionaire owner, Anwar Rashid, and his family had left the South Wing of the house and stopped paying the mortgage because they believed it was haunted. It was repossessed by the bank and is currently for sale at £2.7m.

History

Domesday Book
The manor of Clifton was noted in the Domesday Book of 1086. Clifton Hall is on top of a cliff on the edge of the village of Clifton, overlooking the River Trent, probably because the site was easily defensible.  Clifton Hall was originally a fortified tower house, designed for defence as well as habitation.

de Clifton

Gervase de Clifton (fl. late 13th c.). In the late 13th century, Gervase de Clifton purchased the manor of Clifton (together with nearby Wilford) from the de Rodes family,<ref>Clifton Family of Clifton: a Brief History, introduction to Clifton of Clifton Collection, Manuscripts and Special Collections,  University of Nottingham Manuscripts and Special Collections</ref> and adopted the surname de Clifton from his new seat. His family had long been settled in the area and his earliest known English ancestor was the 11th century Alvaredus, warden of Nottingham Castle. 
Sir Gervase de Clifton (d. 1324), four times High Sheriff of Nottinghamshire, Derbyshire and the Royal Forests firstly in 1279, also four times Sheriff of Yorkshire. He was MP for Nottinghamshire in 1294.
Sir Gervase de Clifton (1313-1391), High Sheriff of Nottinghamshire, Derbyshire and the Royal Forests 1345, Escheator in 1345 and MP in 1347–48. In 1367 he was a Commissioner of Array for Nottinghamshire.
Sir John de Clifton (d. 1403) (grandson),  MP for Nottinghamshire in 1402, High Sheriff of Nottinghamshire, Derbyshire and the Royal Forests. Created a Knight Banneret by King Henry IV before the Battle of Shrewsbury in 1403, in which battle he was killed. In 1382 he married Cathering Cressy, daughter and heiress of Sir John Cressy of Hodsock. Her inheritance of Hodsock and other estates in north Nottinghamshire and in Yorkshire came to the Clifton family. 
Sir Gervase Clifton (d. 1453), only son, MP for Nottinghamshire in 1425–26, and several times appointed a JP for Nottinghamshire. He married Isabel Fraunceys (d. 13 June 1457), the daughter of Sir Robert Fraunceys of Foremark, Derbyshire. 
Sir Gervase Clifton (d. 1471), beheaded after the Battle of Tewkesbury. He was son of Sir Gervase Clifton (d. 15 November 1453) only son of Sir John Clifton (d. 1403) by his wife, Katherine Cressy. 
Sir Gervase Clifton (1438-1491) (grandson of Sir Gervase Clifton, d. 1453), was a Yorkists during the Wars of the Roses. He was appointed Treasurer of Calais in 1482. He fought on the losing side for King Richard III at the Battle of Bosworth in 1485.
Sir Gervase Clifton (d. 1588), Gervase the Gentle. His father died during his infancy. He was a favourite of successive Tudor monarchs. 
Sir Gervase Clifton, 1st Baronet (1587-1666) Gervase the Great (grandson), as an infant succeeded his grandfather. MP and in 1611 was created a Baronet. He married seven times. King Charles I stayed at Clifton Hall in 1632 as his guest. He  prepared for the royal visit by extending his stables, to the design of John Smythson, son of the renowned Jacobean architect Robert Smythson; other works may have been undertaken at the same time, but none survive. In 1608 a junior branch of the family was created Baron Clifton of Leighton Bromswold in Huntingdonshire.

Description of Hall

The Hall was three stories high. Clifton was well known in the 19th century for its grassy terraces and the grove.

Rebuild
The house was largely rebuilt between 1778 and 1797 by a later Sir Gervase Clifton, who employed the premier architect in the north of England John Carr of York. It was probably during this remodelling that the tower of the original house was demolished. The octagonal domed hall built by Sir Robert Clifton, which incorporated many of the old rooms of the house,  was retained during the rebuilding. The south wing of the Hall is Carr's work, but the north wing is of a later date, probably used by servants as quarters and a working area.

In 1896 Sir Hervey Juckes Lloyd Bruce, 4th Baronet (1843–1919) succeeded his cousin Henry Robert Clifton, to part of the Clifton estates. The early Bruce years at Clifton are recalled in Henry James Bruce's book Silken Dalliance (1946).

Lieutenant Colonel Peter Thomas Clifton began in the 1940s to sell off the remainder of the Clifton family estates. A local legend states erroneously that a portrait in the Hall of the colonel on horseback was originally intended to be one of his daughter, but was changed when she died while it was being painted, in a riding accident in Clifton Grove. The story is however untrue as both of the colonel's daughters outlived the colonel and later married. Further alterations were made in the 19th century and a conversion in 1953, when the south front was most likely altered as seen in the photos from c. 1900.

In 1947,  (3,820,000 sqm) of the family's land in Clifton was sold and an auction of the contents of Clifton Hall was held in 1953. In 1958 Peter Thomas Clifton sold Clifton Hall and the remains of the estate, thus ending a period of 700 years of ownership by his family.

After the Clifton family

In 1958 the Hall became Clifton Hall Girls' Grammar School, which closed in 1976. Nottingham Trent University, then Trent Polytechnic, then used the Hall until 2002. In the early 2000s it was sold to Chek Whyte, who built houses on the grounds and converted Clifton Hall into two luxury apartments, the South Wing and the North Wing. Fourteen houses were built to the south east of the Hall. Anwar Rashid bought the South Wing in January 2007 and applied to Nottingham City Council for a licence to hold weddings. In May 2007 the council refused planning permission to hold civil ceremonies and partnerships, conferences, training courses or media events. Rashid moved out after eight months, claiming Clifton Hall was haunted. The North Wing 5 bedroom apartment was sold in March 2016 for £1,250,000.

Haunting
A reputation of Clifton Hall as haunted by ghosts stretches back to at least the time when it was used as a school between 1958 and 1976.

Anwar Rashid, a businessman with a £25 million fortune and a portfolio of 26 properties, bought the South Wing of the Clifton Hall in January 2007. The 52-room Hall  originally included 17 bedrooms, 10 reception rooms and 10 bathrooms, divided in 2001-2003 into two apartments: the 9 bedroom South Wing and the 5 bedroom North Wing. Rashid made his fortune from a chain of nursing homes and a hotel in Dubai. Thirty-two-year-old Rashid and his family, consisting of his 25-year-old wife Nabila, three daughters, and an infant son, moved into the hall the same month they bought it.

From the first day in the house they allegedly experienced paranormal activity, leading them to believe that Clifton Hall was haunted. On the first evening they spent in the house, there was reportedly a knocking on the wall and a voice saying "is anyone there?", however they did not find anyone making the noises. Rashid said "The day we moved in we had our first experience. We sat down in the evening to relax and there was a knock on the wall. We heard this, 'Hello, is anyone there'? We ignored it the first time but two minutes later we heard the man's voice again. I got up to have a look but the doors were locked and the windows were closed."

On another occasion Nabila, Anwar Rashid's wife, thought she saw her eldest daughter watching television downstairs at 5 a.m., however when she checked in her daughter's room, Nabila discovered her daughter was still in bed. Eventually, the family's friends refused to go round to the house.

Eager to get rid of the ghosts the family believed were haunting them, they invited Ashfield Paranormal Investigation Team (T.A.P.I.T.) to investigate the hall. The investigators were unable to stop the haunting and the leader of the group said "Clifton Hall is the only place where I've ever really been scared, even in the light. It's just got a really eerie feeling about it". When drops of blood were found on the baby's quilt of their 18-month-old son, the family decided to leave. Rashid said "When we found red blood spots on the baby's quilt, that was the day my wife said she'd had enough. We didn't even stay that night".

After spending eight months in Clifton Hall, the family moved out of the house in August 2007. They stopped paying the mortgage in January 2008 and, on 18 September 2008, the Yorkshire Bank reclaimed the property. Speaking of his experience in Clifton Hall, Rashid said "When people used to tell me about ghosts, I would never believe them and would say 'whatever'. But I would have to tell any new owner that it was haunted having experienced it".

References

Further reading

Bruce, Rev. Rosslyn, Rector of Clifton, The Clifton Book (Nottingham), 1906, esp. Chapter III. The Cliftons of Clifton''

External links
Clifton Hall website

Grade I listed houses
Grade I listed buildings in Nottinghamshire
Country houses in Nottinghamshire
Reportedly haunted locations in East Midlands
Clifton, Nottinghamshire